Rosemary Clooney Sings the Lyrics of Johnny Mercer is a 1986 album by Rosemary Clooney, of songs with lyrics by Johnny Mercer. Most of the album features Clooney singing with a small swing group directed by pianist John Oddo, though Clooney performs two of the selections ("I Remember You" and "P.S. I Love You") as duets with guitarist Ed Bickert.

Track listing

Personnel
 Rosemary Clooney – vocals
 Dan Barrett 
 Scott Hamilton – tenor saxophone
 John Oddo – piano
 Ed Bickert – guitar
 Michael Moore – bass
 Joe Cocuzzo  – drums

References

1987 albums
Johnny Mercer tribute albums
Rosemary Clooney albums
Concord Records albums